The 1995 Rhein Fire season was the inaugural season for the franchise in the World League of American Football (WLAF). The team was led by head coach Galen Hall, and played its home games at Rheinstadion in Düsseldorf, Germany. They finished the regular season in fifth place with a record of four wins and six losses.

Offseason

World League draft

NFL allocations

Personnel

Staff

Roster

Schedule

Standings

Game summaries

Week 1: at Scottish Claymores

Week 2: vs London Monarchs

Week 3: at Barcelona Dragons

Week 4: vs Frankfurt Galaxy

Week 5: at Amsterdam Admirals

Week 6: vs Scottish Claymores

Week 7: at Frankfurt Galaxy

Week 8: at London Monarchs

Week 9: vs Barcelona Dragons

Week 10: vs Amsterdam Admirals

Notes

References

Rhein Fire seasons
Rhein
Rhein